Jimmy Kerrigan (born 8 March 1959 in Cork, Ireland) is a former Irish sportsman. He played Gaelic football with his local club Nemo Rangers and was a member of the Cork senior inter-county team from 1978 until 1990. Kerrigan is one of the most decorated inter-county club footballers of all-time. His son, Paul Kerrigan, is currently a member of the Cork senior football team.

Honours

Nemo Rangers
All-Ireland Senior Club Football Championship:
Winner (5): 1979, 1982, 1984 (c), 1989, 1994
Munster Senior Club Football Championship:
Winner (6): 1978, 1981, 1983 (c), 1987, 1988, 1993
Cork Senior Football Championship:
Winner (7): 1977, 1978, 1981, 1983 (c), 1987, 1988, 1993
Cork Under-21 Football Championship:
Winner (2): 1979, 1980

Cork
All-Ireland Senior Football Championship:
Winner (2): 1989, 1990 (sub)
Runner-up (1): 1987
Munster Senior Football Championship:
Winner (4): 1983, 1987, 1989, 1990 (sub)
Runner-up (8): 1978, 1979, 1980, 1981, 1982, 1984, 1985, 1986
National Football League:
Winner (2): 1979–80, 1988–89
Runner-up (2): 1978–79, 1981–82
All-Ireland Under-21 Football Championship:
Winner (1): 1980
Runner-up (1): 1979
Munster Under-21 Football Championship:
Winner (2): 1979, 1980
Runner-up (1): 1978
Munster Minor Football Championship:
Winner (1): 1977

Munster
Railway Cup:
Winner (1): 1982
Runner-up (1): 1985

References

1959 births
Living people
Nemo Rangers Gaelic footballers
Cork inter-county Gaelic footballers
Munster inter-provincial Gaelic footballers
Winners of one All-Ireland medal (Gaelic football)